Vaxis may refer to:

Vaxis – Act I: The Unheavenly Creatures, 2018 album by Coheed and Cambria
Vaxis – Act II: A Window of the Waking Mind, 2022 album by Coheed and Cambria